Naujieji Lietuviai fm 2020 m kaune(NL) (meaning "New Lithuanians" in Lithuanian) was a musical group in Lithuania. It was established in 2003.

It was supported by the girl group 69 Danguje (vocals, choreography).

In 2003 they made their name with the song Pasitusinam!, a parody on the political life in Lithuania.

In 2005 the TV 1 channel declared their song Afigenai to be the most popular song and videoclip of the year. In addition, in 2006 Pravda Magazine, it  recognized "afigenai" to be the best neologism of year 2005.

The group garnered their popularity primarily over the internet: radio stations did not play their songs due to the liberal use of obscenities.

In 2006 the group authored two albums, 001 and 002. In 2007 one of them claimed to become gold and one platinum.

In 2007 NL was disbanded amid a dispute, and Egidijus Remeikis and Egmontas Bžeskas, together with entrepreneur Ugnius Kiguolis, created the Tipo Grupė group.

On the night August 22–23, 1:45am, 2008, two group members, Egidijus Remeikis and Jevgenijus Snytkinas died in car accident in Kaunas. After that Tipo Grupe effectively ceased to exist.

References

External links
Youtube account NaujiejiLietuviai

Lithuanian pop music groups
2003 establishments in Lithuania
Musical groups established in 2003
Musical groups established in 2007